Events from the year 1698 in art.

Events
 September – Maximilian II Emanuel, Prince-Elector of Bavaria, purchases Rubens' Adoration of the Magi from Gijsbert van Ceulen.

Works
 Nicolò Fumo –  Fallen Christ (wooden sculpture)
 Hyacinthe Rigaud –  Self-portrait in a turban

Births

 May 17 – Gio Nicola Buhagiar, Maltese painter (died 1752)
 May 29 – Edmé Bouchardon, French sculptor (died 1762)
 September 15 – Pier Francesco Guala, Italian painter active for the most part in the region of his place of birth, Casale Monferrato (died 1757)
 October 13 – Giacomo Ceruti, Italian painter of peasants (died 1767)
 October 30 – Paul Troger, Austrian painter, draughtsman and printmaker (died 1762)
 date unknown
 Benoît Audran the Younger, French engraver (died 1772)
 Gaudenzio Botti, Italian painter, mainly active in Brescia (died 1778)
 Felice Cappelletti, Italian painter active in Verona (died 1738)
 Antonio David, Italian portrait painter, especially of the House of Stuart (died 1750)
 Filippo della Valle, Italian sculptor (died 1768)
 Louis de Moni, Dutch genre painter (died 1771)
 Franz Xaver Feuchtmayer, German Baroque stucco plasterer of the Wessobrunner School (died 1763)
 Johann Preissler, engraver (died 1771)
 probable
 Giovanni Francesco Braccioli, Italian painter, mainly active in Ferrara (died 1762)
 Susanna Drury, Irish painter chiefly noted for her watercolours (died 1770)

Deaths
 April 27 – Jacopo Chiavistelli, Italian painter of quadratura (born 1618/1621)
 June 1 – Maurelio Scanavini, Italian painter, mainly active in Ferrara (born 1665)
 June 10 – Gerrit Adriaenszoon Berckheyde, Dutch artist (born 1638)
 September 21 – Catherine Duchemin, French flower and fruit painter (born 1630)
 October 6 – Johann Carl Loth, German painter active in Venice (born 1632)
 November – Rombout Verhulst, sculptor from Brabant (born 1624)
 December 16 – Simone Pignoni, Italian painter of both licentious then later pious works (born 1611)
 date unknown
 Francesco Barbieri, Italian painter (born 1623)
 Johann Anton Eismann, Austrian painter (born 1604)
 Teresa Maria Languasco, Italian painter and a monk (born 1651)
 Hâfiz Osman, Ottoman calligrapher (born 1642)
 Pieter Peutemans, Dutch Golden Age painter (born 1641)
 Zha Shibiao, landscape painter and calligrapher from Anhui (born 1615)

 
Years of the 17th century in art
1690s in art